Jeong Jae-heon (born April 18, 1975) is a South Korean voice actor and actor. 

In 2002, Jeong joined Munhwa Broadcasting Corporation's Voice Acting Division. After being a freelancer, Jeong made a brief appearance on a 2005 South Korean film Quiz King, playing his role as a television news reporter. The voice actor became popular with his dub of Kiyomaro Takamine on Zatch Bell!, which has been one of his signature works. He gained popularity also by replacing Adam Rodriguez on CSI: Miami, and Archie Kao on CSI: Crime Scene Investigation. In late 2011, Jeong once was on stage, portraying Lee Mong-ryong in a South Korean charity play Hyang-dan, Fly. He has recently been known for his voicing Shota Kazehaya on the Korean dub of a Japanese television animation series From Me to You, which made many fans of Jeong call him Jeong-jae-ha-ya (a compound word formed from Jeong Jae-heon and Kazehaya).

Filmography

Television animation 
 3000 Leagues in Search of Mother, Tonio Rossi
 Ace Attorney, Ryunosuke Naruhodo
 Alvinnn!!! and the Chipmunks, Simon Seville
 Air, Ryūya
 Animal Detective Kiruminzoo, Kanon's Grandfather
 Auto-B-Good, Derek, Johnny
 Bakugan Battle Brawlers, Hydron, Michael Gehabich
 Bakugan Battle Gear, Sid Arkale
 Beyblade: Metal Fusion, Tsubasa Otori
 Big Windup!, Kazutoshi Oki, Yoshirou Hamada
 Blazing Teens, Leon
 Bleach, Luppi Antenor
 Buddy Thunderstruck, Buddy Thunderstruck
 Cells at Work!, U-1146
 Chico Bon Bon: Monkey with a Tool Belt, Chico Bon Bon
 Cross Fight B-Daman, Basara Kurohuchi, Reiji Maki, Steer=Eagle
 Demon King from Today!, The Original King
 Detective Conan, Hakuba Saguru
 Eyeshield 21, Haruto Sakuraba
 Fairy Tail, Bora, Zeref
 From Me to You, Shota Kazehaya
 Genseishin Justirisers Demon Knight
 Genshiken, Kanji Sasahara
 Ghost Files, Kurama
 Giga Tribe, Tribe Green
 Gurren Lagann, Simon
 Haikyu!! (season 2), Tōru Oikawa
 Haruka: Beyond the Stream of Time, Eisen
 Hero Tales, Housei
 Hunter × Hunter, Hisoca
 Inazuma Eleven, Ichinose Kazuya, Nagumo Haruya, Shishido Sakichi
 Keshikasu-kun, Keshikasu-kun
 Kiba, Noa
 Littlest Pet Shop: A World of Our Own, Trip Hamston
 Looney Tunes Cartoons, Bugs Bunny
 Lovely Complex, Kazuki Kohori
 Lucky Star, Minoru Shiraishi
 Mōtto! Ojamajo Doremi, Ki-joon
 Naruto: Shippuden, Deidara
 Ninjago: Masters of Spinjitzu, Zane the White/Ice Ninja
 Octonauts, Kwazii
 One Piece, Trafalgar Law
 One-Punch Man, Speed-o'-Sound Sonic
 Oscar's Oasis, Roco
 The Penguins of Madagascar, Private
 Rapunzel's Tangled Adventure, Varian
 The Raspberry Times, Lime
 Revbahaf: The Story of Rebuilding the Kingdom, The Crown Prince of Viesenhar
 Robocar Poli, Dumpoo, Mr. Builder
 SD Gundam Force, Chief Haro
 SonicX, Shadow the Hedgehog
 That's Amazing!! Mr. Masaru, Machahiko Kondō
 Uncle Grandpa, Pizza Steve
 Yes! Pretty Cure 5 GoGo!, Kanjine
 Violet Evergarden, Gilbert Bougainvillea
 Yu-Gi-Oh! Duel Monsters, Ryou Bakura
 Yumi's Cells, Detective Cell, Ku Woong's Love cell, Ku Woong's Humor cell
 Zatch Bell!, Kiyomaro Takamine

Film animation 
 Children Who Chase Lost Voices from Deep Below, Shin, Shun
 Honggildong 2084, Hong Il-dong
 Haikyu!! the Movie: Winners and Losers, Tōru Oikawa
 Haikyu!! Genius and Sense, Tōru Oikawa
 Hop, Fred O'Hare
 Inazuma Eleven: Saikyō Gundan Ōga Shūrai, Ichinose Kazuya, Shishido Sakichi, Tobitaka Seiya
 Inazuma Eleven GO: Kyūkyoku no Kizuna Gurifon, Mariya Kasaki
 Invader Zim: Enter the Florpus, Almighty Tallest Purple
 Madagascar 3: Europe's Most Wanted, Rico
 Metal Fight Beyblade vs the Sun: Sol Blaze, the Scorching Hot Invader, Tsubasa Otori
 Naruto the Movie: Blood Prison, Mui
 Ni No Kuni, haru
 One Piece: Stampede, Trafalgar Law
 Penguins of Madagascar, Private
 Pokémon: Arceus and the Jewel of Life, Arceus
 Pokémon the Movie: Secrets of the Jungle, Dr. Zed
 Sing, Miss Crawly
 Space Chimps 2: Zartog Strikes Back, Comet
 Space Jam: A New Legacy, Bugs Bunny
 The Story of Mr. Sorry, Choi Go-bong
 Toy Story 4, Forky
 Vivo, Vivo
 Wish Dragon, Pockets
 Zootopia, Nick Wilde

Video games 
 007: Quantum of Solace, Carter
 Apex Legends, Seer
 Blue Dragon, King Jibral
 Cookie Run: Kingdom, Vampire Cookie
 Diablo III, Imperius
 Dota 2, Ember Spirit
 Granado Espada, Scout, War Rock
 Grand Chase, Ronan
 Elsword, Add
 Halo: Reach, Jun-A266 (Noble Three)
 Huxley, Male Alternix
 Kingdom Under Fire: Circle of Doom, Leinhart
 League of Legends, Talon (The Blade's Shadow), Vladimir (The Crimson Reaper)
 Lost Ark, Carmine
 Lost Odyssey, Kaim Argonar
 MapleStory, Xenon, Gelimer, Checky, Aaron (Gerand Darmoor)
 ROHAN Online, Dahn
 Seven Knights, Dellons
 StarCraft, Siege Tank
 StarCraft II: Heart of the Swarm, Valerian Mengsk
 StarCraft II: Wings of Liberty, Crucio Siege Tank, Valerian Mengsk
 TalesRunner, Harang
 World of Warcraft, Blood Elf, Kael'thas Sunstrider, Malakras

Dubbing

Film 
 3 Idiots, Rahul Kumar as Manmohan "MM" aka Millimeter/Centimeter
 All the Pretty Horses, Lucas Black as Jimmy Blevins
 The Amazing Spider-Man, Andrew Garfield as Peter Parker/Spider-Man
 Assault on Precinct 13, Ja Rule as Smiley
 Avengers: Endgame, Maximiliano Hernández as Jasper Sitwell
 The Bourne Legacy, Jeremy Renner as Aaron Cross/Kenneth James Kitsom/Dr. Karl Brundage/Outcome 5
 Bumblebee, Dylan O'Brien as Bumblebee
 The Butterfly Effect, William Lee Scott as Tommy Miller
 Camp Rock, Joe Jonas as Shane Gray
 Carrie, Ansel Elgort as Tommy Ross
 Captain America: The Winter Soldier, Maximiliano Hernández as Jasper Sitwell
 The Cat in the Hat, Sean Hayes as Mr. Humberfloob/The Fish
 Code 8, Stephen Amell as Garrett Kelton
 Con Air, Renoly Santiago as Ramon Martinez
 Coneheads, Chris Farley as Ronnie Bradford the Mechanic
 Constantine, Shia LaBeouf as Chas Kramer
 Cruella, John McCrea as Artie
 Crying Out Love, In the Center of the World, Mirai Moriyama as Sakutaro Matsumoto (High School)
 Don't Tempt Me, Gael García Bernal as Jack Davenport
 Election, Nicholas D'Agosto as Larry Fouch
 Eloise at Christmastime, Gavin Creel as Bill
 The Eye 2, Jesdaporn Pholdee as Sam
 Ghost World, Brad Renfro as Josh
 Gone in 60 Seconds, T.J. Cross as "Mirror Man"
 The Grudge, Jason Behr as Doug McCarthy
 Hidalgo, Victor Talmadge as Rau Rasmussen
 Hysteria, Hugh Dancy as Dr. Mortimer Granville
 Lawnmower Man 2: Beyond Cyberspace, Austin O'Brien as Peter Parkette
 Ong-Bak: Muay Thai Warrior, Cheathavuth Watcharakhun as Peng
 The Patriot, Tchéky Karyo as Major Jean Villeneuve
 The Road Home, Zheng Hao as Luo Changyu
 The Rock, Anthony Clark as Paul, Danny Nucci as Lieutenant Shephard
 Shallow Hal, Zen Gesner as Ralph
 Showtime, Mos Def as Lazy Boy
 Slap Her... She's French, Trent Ford as Ed Mitchell
 Snatch, Andy Beckwith as Errol
 Spy Kids 3D, Matt O'Leary as Gary Giggles
 Tall Girl, Luke Eisner as Stig Mohlin
 Teen Beach Movie, Ross Lynch as Brady
 Thor, Maximiliano Hernández as Jasper Sitwell
 To Gillian on Her 37th Birthday, Freddie Prinze Jr. as Joey Bost
 Zombies, Milo Manheim as Zed

Television show 
 24, Randle Mell as Brad Hammond (until the second season)
 The A List, Jacob Dudman(Series 1) and Barnaby Tobias(Series 2–present) as Dev
 CSI: Crime Scene Investigation, Archie Kao as Archie Johnson
 CSI: Miami, Adam Rodriguez as Eric Delko
 Julie and the Phantoms, Booboo Stewart as Willie
 Prison Break, Marshall Allman as Lincoln "L. J." Burrows Jr.
 How to Get Away with Murder, Jack Falahee as Connor Walsh

Tokusatsu 
 Engine Sentai Go-onger, Renn Kōsaka
 Kamen Rider Decade, Tsukasa Kadoya
 Kamen Rider Ex-Aid, Kuroto Dan
 Mahō Sentai Magiranger, Kai Ozu
 Ultraman Geed, Leito Igaguri
 Ultraman X, Daichi Ozora

Narrations 
 Consumer Report
 The World Is Now

TV appearances 
 Tooni One Choice
 Beautiful Wishes
 Story Jobs

Film appearance 
 Quiz King, News Reporter

Stage appearance 
 Hyang-dan, Fly, Lee Mong-ryong

See also 
 Munhwa Broadcasting Corporation
 MBC Voice Acting Division

References

External links 
 Jeong Jae-heon's blog on MBC Voice 
 정재헌 바이러스♡ (Jeong Jae-heon Virus): The official fan club of Jeong Jae-heon 

1975 births
Living people
South Korean male voice actors